Ted Parsons is an American drummer most notable for his membership in bands such as Swans, Prong, Godflesh, Killing Joke, and Jesu.

Biography
Parsons' early career began in 1985 with Swans, when he contributed to their Holy Money album. He left Swans in 1987 and joined guitarist Tommy Victor's fledgling Prong. In 1994, he appeared on Buckethead's album Giant Robot. Prong would be Parsons' main project until the group disbanded in 1996. He then started a long-standing friendship with UK composer Justin Broadrick, playing on Godflesh's 1996 tour and their album Hymns. Parsons has also played in Of Cabbages and Kings with former Swans bandmate Algis Kizys and was a one-time member of Foetus touring band.

Over the years, Parsons has also recorded with members of Public Image Ltd., The Legendary Pink Dots, Killing Joke and Gator Bait Ten, a project by Science Slam Sonic Explorers, some of whom appear on his recent NIC remix project album. Youth of Killing Joke contributed a remix based on a Glen Brown/Sylford Walker dub tune.

Parsons is a frequent member of Justin Broadrick's Jesu project, and has his own dub group, Teledubgnosis.

References

Bibliography
Further reading:

External links
 Teledubgnosis reviews by Greg Whitfield, a.k.a. "Prof Barnabas":
 http://www.reggae-vibes.com/rev_sin/magnetic.htm
 http://www.reggae-vibes.com/rev_sin/teledubg.htm
 http://reggae-vibes.com/rev_sin/nic.htm

Killing Joke members
Living people
Godflesh members
Year of birth missing (living people)
Of Cabbages and Kings members
Swans (band) members
American rock drummers
American experimental musicians
Prong (band) members